Strabomantis cornutus is a species of frog in the family Strabomantidae. It is found along the eastern flank of the Andes of Ecuador and Colombia (Cordillera Oriental) north to Caquetá Department. Common name Rio Suno robber frog has been coined for it. It has been confused with other species (e.g., Strabomantis sulcatus).

Description
The snout is truncate in lateral profile. The tympanum is prominent. Skin is prominently tuberculate dorsally and smooth ventrally. The eyelid bears 1–2 elongated tubercles. The finger and toe discs are small; the toes have lateral fringes but no webbing. The dorsum is dull reddish brown or dull olive-brown with black and reddish brown markings. The venter is dark brown or brown dotted with (grayish) white. The posterior surfaces of the thighs are black with white or blueish white flecks.

Habitat and conservation
It is largely a nocturnal and terrestrial species recorded on the forest floor and stream banks. It is a rare species threatened by habitat loss caused by agriculture, human settlement, and logging. It is known from the Podocarpus National Park (Ecuador) and its range overlaps with a few other protected areas.

References

External links
 

cornutus
Amphibians of the Andes
Amphibians of Colombia
Amphibians of Ecuador
Amphibians described in 1870
Taxa named by Marcos Jiménez de la Espada
Taxonomy articles created by Polbot